Camptown is an unincorporated community in Bradford County, Pennsylvania, United States. Camptown has a post office with ZIP code 18815.

Popular culture 
The town is known as the inspiration for the minstrel song "Camptown Races" by Stephen Foster.

References

Unincorporated communities in Bradford County, Pennsylvania
Unincorporated communities in Pennsylvania